La Riviera is a census-designated place (CDP) in Sacramento County, California, United States. It is part of the Sacramento–Arden-Arcade–Roseville Metropolitan Statistical Area. The population was 10,802 at the 2010 census, up from 10,273 at the 2000 census. La Riviera is a primarily residential neighborhood located between the American River on the North side and Highway 50 on the southern border.

Geography
La Riviera is located at  (38.566773, -121.356772).

Demographics

2010
The 2010 United States Census reported that La Riviera had a population of 10,802. The racial makeup of La Riviera was 7,315 (67.7%) White, 1,084 (10.0%) African American, 76 (0.7%) Native American, 766 (7.1%) Asian, 87 (0.8%) Pacific Islander, 671 (6.2%) from other races, and 803 (7.4%) from two or more races. Hispanic or Latino of any race were 1,756 persons (16.3%).

The Census reported that 10,715 people (99.2% of the population) lived in households, 15 (0.1%) lived in non-institutionalized group quarters, and 72 (0.7%) were institutionalized.

There were 4,475 households, out of which 1,170 (26.1%) had children under the age of 18 living in them, 1,663 (37.2%) were opposite-sex married couples living together, 581 (13.0%) had a female householder with no husband present, 243 (5.4%) had a male householder with no wife present.  There were 339 (7.6%) unmarried opposite-sex partnerships, and 60 (1.3%) same-sex married couples or partnerships. 1,335 households (29.8%) were made up of individuals, and 357 (8.0%) had someone living alone who was 65 years of age or older. The average household size was 2.39.  There were 2,487 families (55.6% of all households); the average family size was 2.98.

The population was spread out, with 2,117 people (19.6%) under the age of 18, 1,483 people (13.7%) aged 18 to 24, 3,134 people (29.0%) aged 25 to 44, 2,691 people (24.9%) aged 45 to 64, and 1,377 people (12.7%) who were 65 years of age or older.  The median age was 35.1 years. For every 100 females, there were 100.4 males.  For every 100 females age 18 and over, there were 98.3 males.

The homeowner vacancy rate was 1.8%; the rental vacancy rate was 7.6%.  5,635 people (52.2% of the population) lived in owner-occupied housing units and 5,080 people (47.0%) lived in rental housing units.

2000
As of the census of 2000, there were 10,273 people, 4,345 households, and 2,480 families residing in the CDP. The racial makeup of the CDP was 72.46% White, 8.49% African American, 0.63% Native American, 7.97% Asian, 0.57% Pacific Islander, 4.24% from other races, and 5.63% from two or more races. Hispanic or Latino of any race were 11.34% of the population.

There were 4,345 households, out of which 23.9% had children under the age of 18 living with them, 40.2% were married couples living together, 12.6% had a female householder with no husband present, and 42.9% were non-families. 29.3% of all households were made up of individuals, and 5.7% had someone living alone who was 65 years of age or older.  The average household size was 2.36 and the average family size was 2.92.

In the CDP, the population was spread out, with 19.8% under the age of 18, 13.4% from 18 to 24, 33.6% from 25 to 44, 23.3% from 45 to 64, and 9.8% who were 65 years of age or older.  The median age was 34 years. For every 100 females, there were 99.3 males.  For every 100 females age 18 and over, there were 95.9 males.

The median income for a household in the CDP was $49,110, and the median income for a family was $57,792. Males had a median income of $39,766 versus $33,295 for females. The per capita income for the CDP was $24,034.  About 5.7% of families and 10.5% of the population were below the poverty line, including 10.5% of those under age 18 and 5.8% of those age 65 or over.

Transportation
La Riviera is located on the "Gold Line" of Regional Transit's light rail line. The Watt/Manlove, Starfire, Tiber, and Butterfield light rail stations are located in La Riviera.

Commercial and industry
The Glenbrook Shopping Center on La Riviera Drive at the Watt Avenue offramp is the main shopping center for the area. There are also other commercial endeavors located along Folsom Boulevard, the primary street through the area. Near the Butterfield light rail station, the California Franchise Tax Board has a large office complex.

Education
La Riviera is served by both the Sacramento City Unified School District and the Folsom-Cordova School District.

High schools
Rosemont High School is the high school that serves not only the La Riviera area but the adjacent Rosemont area. It opened in 2003 and is part of the Sacramento City schools.

Government

References

Census-designated places in Sacramento County, California
Census-designated places in California